Troctomorpha is one of the three major suborders of Psocodea (formerly Psocoptera)(barklice, booklice, and parasitic lice), alongside Psocomorpha and Trogiomorpha. There are more than 30 families and 5,800 described species in Troctomorpha. The order includes parasitic lice, which are most closely related to the booklice family Liposcelididae.

Cladogram 
Cladogram showing the position of Troctomorpha within Psocodea:

Fossil record 
The oldest record of the suborder is suggested to be Paramesopsocus adibi, known from the Late Jurassic Karabastau Formation of Kazakhstan.

Classification
Troctomorpha contains the following subgroups:
 Infraorder: Amphientometae
 Family: Amphientomidae Enderlein, 1903 (tropical barklice)
 Family: Compsocidae Mockford, 1967
 Family: Electrentomidae Enderlein, 1911
 Family: Manicapsocidae Mockford, 1967
 Family: Musapsocidae Mockford, 1967
 Family: Protroctopsocidae Smithers, 1972
 Family: Troctopsocidae Mockford, 1967
 Infraorder: Nanopsocetae
 Family: Liposcelididae Broadhead, 1950 (booklice)
 Family: Pachytroctidae Enderlein, 1904 (thick barklice)
 Family: Sphaeropsocidae Menon, 1941
 Parvorder: Phthiraptera
 Superfamily: Amblycera
 Family: Ancistronidae
 Family: Boopiidae Mjoberg, 1910
 Family: Colpocephalidae Eichler, 1937
 Family: Gliricolidae
 Family: Gyropidae Kellogg, 1896
 Family: Laemobothriidae Mjoberg, 1910
 Family: Menoponidae Mjoberg, 1910 (chicken body lice)
 Family: Pseudomenoponidae Mjoberg, 1910
 Family: Ricinidae Neumann, 1890
 Family: Somaphantidae Eichler, 1941
 Family: Trimenoponidae
 Family: Trinotonidae Eichler, 1941
 Superfamily: Anoplura
 Family: Echinophthiriidae Enderlein, 1904 (seal lice)
 Family: Enderleinellidae Ewing, 1929
 Family: Haematopinidae Enderlein, 1904 (ungulate lice)
 Family: Hamophthiriidae Johnson, 1969
 Family: Hoplopleuridae Ewing, 1929 (armoured lice)
 Family: Hybothiridae Ewing, 1929
 Family: Linognathidae Webb, 1946 (pale lice)
 Family: Microthoraciidae Kim & Lugwig, 1978
 Family: Neolinognathidae Fahrenholz, 1936
 Family: Pecaroecidae Kéler, 1963
 Family: Pedicinidae Enderlein, 1904
 Family: Pediculidae Leach, 1817 (body lice, head lice)
 Family: Polyplacidae Fahrenholz, 1912 (spiny rat lice)
 Family: Pthiridae Ewing, 1929 (crab lice or pubic lice)
 Family: Ratemiidae Kim & Lugwig, 1978
 Superfamily: Ischnocera (paraphyletic)
 Family: Bovicolidae
 Family: Dasyonygidae
 Family: Goniodidae
 Family: Heptapsogasteridae
 Family: Lipeuridae
 Family: Philopteridae Nitzsch, 1818 (paraphyletic)
 Family: Trichodectidae
 Family: Trichophilopteridae
 Superfamily: Rhyncophthirina
 Family: Haematomyzidae Enderlein, 1904

References

Further reading

 

 
Insect suborders
Psocodea